Labyrinth is the third full-length album by Italian technical death metal band Fleshgod Apocalypse. It was released on August 16, 2013, through Nuclear Blast.

Concept
The album is a concept album based upon the labyrinth of Knossos and the characters related to the associated myth. Guitarist and vocalist Tommaso Riccardi said "We focused on the philological aspect in order to represent all the elements of the classic world and, through a manic and meticulous research, we managed to create a metaphor with our times, as the maze can be associated with the endless search for what we really are."

Track listing

Personnel

Fleshgod Apocalypse
Tommaso Riccardi - lead vocals, rhythm guitar
Cristiano Trionfera - lead guitar, backing vocals
Paolo Rossi - bass
Francesco Paoli - drums, backing vocals, additional guitars
Francesco Ferrini - pianos, orchestral samples
Mattia Ongaro - drums after 2018

Additional personnel
Veronica Bordacchini – operatic vocals (tracks 1, 4, 5 & 9)
Marco Sensi - classical guitar on track 8
Riccardo Perugini - percussions & marching snare
Luca Moretti - cello solo on track 9
Stefano Morabito – production, mixing, mastering
Colin Marks – artwork
photo by Salvatore Perrone
make up by Claudio Castellani

Charts

References

Fleshgod Apocalypse albums
2013 albums
Nuclear Blast albums
Concept albums